Munain is a small village in Alava, Spain, that is situated on the plains of Alava, within the southern section of Ordoñana. Munain is 617 meters above sea level. Until the 19th century, residents primarily spoke Basque, but now Spanish is the most commonly spoken language.

Demography  
Prior to the 13th century, only ten people lived in Munain. Contrary to the trend in other villages of the region, during the Middle Ages, the population of Munain increased, while other villages lost population. By the 18th century, the population of Munain had increased to 129 people. The village's population held steady through the 20th century but dramatically shrank by the 21st century.

Munain's church 

The church was established in 1544 by Ramiro de Okariz. The building is a rectangular structure with a straight head and two thrones covered with vaults. It features a compact tower with four floors, the first one being a portico and the fourth a belfry. The church has a chapel known as the Chapel of the Bicuñas where holy doctors and evangelists meet. It has an altarpiece dating to the early 17th century with sculptures of San Pedro and San Pablo on either side.

Centennial oak trees 
The Munain-Okariz region is home to numerous ancient oak trees of considerable size. Residents of the town let the oaks grow, sometimes using them for fuelwood and for the charcoal burner. Experts from the United Kingdom arrived to study them.  

Munain-Okariz's forest consists of only 385 hectares, with 213 hectares in Munain and 171 hectares in Okariz. It is a protected landscape and has been designated a Place of Community Interest within the area. It is near the headwaters of the Zadorra River. 

Populated places in Álava